The 2022–23 Nemzeti Bajnokság I (known as the K&H női kézilabda liga for sponsorship reasons) is the 72nd season of the Nemzeti Bajnokság I, Hungarian premier Handball league.

Team information 
As in the previous season, 14 teams played in the 2021–22 season.
After the 2021–22 season, Szombathelyi KKA and Vasas SC were relegated to the 2022–23 Nemzeti Bajnokság I/B. They were replaced by two clubs from the 2021–22 Nemzeti Bajnokság I/B; Békéscsabai Előre NKSE and Nemzeti Kézilabda Akadémia.

Personnel and kits
Following is the list of clubs competing in 2022–23 Nemzeti Bajnokság I, with their president, head coach, kit manufacturer and shirt sponsor.

Managerial changes

League table

Schedule and results
In the table below the home teams are listed on the left and the away teams along the top.

Number of teams by counties

References

See also
 2022–23 Győri Audi ETO KC season

External links
 Hungarian Handball Federaration 
 handball.hu
 kezitortenelem.hu

Nemzeti Bajnokság I (women's handball)
2022–23 domestic handball leagues
Nemzeti Bajnoksag I Women
2022 in women's handball
2023 in women's handball